Los Super Seven is an American supergroup which debuted in 1998. According to Allmusic's Stephen Thomas Erlewine, "Los Super Seven isn't a band, per se – it's a collective, organized by manager Dan Goodman, who comes up with a concept for each of the group's albums and assembles a band to fit." The collective has released three albums to date, with wildly varying personnel. Only Ruben Ramos and Rick Trevino are featured on all three releases.

The group won a Grammy Award for Best Mexican/Mexican-American Album in 1999 for its self-titled album. Their musical style has changed with each incarnation, blending sounds from Tejano, mariachi, Cuban, Afro-Peruvian, Brazilian, blues, rhythm and blues, country, jazz and rock. The personnel included the members of Texas Tornados, Los Lobos, Calexico, Ozomatli, and others.

Discography
Los Super Seven (1998)
Canto (2001)
Heard It on the X (2005)

Members

Members on Los Super Seven
 Joe Ely – guitar, vocals
 Freddy Fender – vocals
 David Hidalgo (of Los Lobos) – guitar, vocals
 Flaco Jiménez – accordion, vocals
 Ruben Ramos – vocals
 Cesar Rosas (of Los Lobos) – guitar, vocals
 Rick Treviño – guitar, vocals
 Doug Sahm – vocals
 Max Baca – bajo sexto, vocals
 Joel Guzman – accordion, vocals
 Steve Berlin (of Los Lobos) – Producer
 Rick Clark – Music consultant
 Dan Goodman – Executive producer
 Dave McNair – Engineer/mixer

Members on Canto 
 Wil-Dog Abers (of Ozomatli) – bass
 Susana Baca – vocals
 David Hidalgo – bass, guitar, percussion, arranger, drums, vocals, requinto
 Raul Malo (of the Mavericks) – vocals
 Ruben Ramos – vocals
 Rick Treviño – vocals
 Cesar Rosas – bass, guitar, vocals, guitarron, jarana
 Alberto Salas – piano, arranger
 Caetano Veloso – guitar, vocals
 Conrad Lozano (of Los Lobos) – guitarron
 Louie Perez (of Los Lobos)
 Cougar Estrada (of Los Lobos) – percussion, drums
 Steve Berlin – (of Los Lobos) Producer
 Rick Clark – Music consultant
 Dan Goodman – Executive producer
 Dave McNair – Engineer/mixer

Members on Heard It on the X
 Clarence "Gatemouth" Brown – guitar, vocals
 Rodney Crowell – vocals
 Joe Ely – vocals
 Freddy Fender – vocals
 John Hiatt – vocals
 Lyle Lovett – vocals
 Raul Malo – vocals
 Ruben Ramos – vocals
 Delbert McClinton – vocals
 Rick Trevino – vocals
 Joey Burns (of Calexico) – nylon-string acoustic guitar, electric bass, upright bass, piano, arranger
 John Convertino (of Calexico) – drums, percussion
 Paul Niehaus (of Calexico) – pedal steel guitar, baritone electric guitar, 6-string bass guitar
 Jacob Valenzuela (of Calexico) – trumpet
 Martin Wenk (of Calexico) – trumpet, vibes, claves
 Volker Zander (of Calexico) – upright bass
 Flaco Jiménez – accordion
 Denny Freeman – electric guitar, piano
 John Contreras – acoustic guitar, vihuela
 Max Baca – bajo sexto, backing vocals
 Adolph Ortiz - guitarron, backing vocals
 Augie Meyers – piano
 Hunt Sales – drums
 Redd Volkaert – electric guitar
 Charlie Sexton – guitars, lap steel guitar, piano, percussion, producer
 Rick Clark, Dan Goodman, Charlie Sexton – Producers
 Dave McNair – Engineer/mixer
 Texas Treefort Studios – Recording complex, Austin TX

References

External links
 Los Super Seven official site

Latin American music
Grammy Award winners
Rock music supergroups
Musical groups established in 1998